Graham Oxenden (23 January 1802 – 8 December 1826) was an English first-class cricketer who played for Cambridge University in one match, totalling 0 runs with a highest score of 0.

Oxenden was born at Broome Park, Kent, the family seat of the Oxenden baronets. His father was Sir Henry Oxenden, 7th Baronet; one of his brothers, Charles Oxenden, was also a cricketer. Graham Oxenden was educated at Harrow School and Christ's College, Cambridge. He graduated in 1825 and died in the following year.

References

Bibliography
 

1802 births
1826 deaths
People educated at Harrow School
Alumni of Christ's College, Cambridge
English cricketers of 1787 to 1825
Cambridge University cricketers